Tuyserkan County is in Hamadan province, Iran. The capital of the county is the city of Tuyserkan. At the 2006 census, the county's population was 109,262 in 28,917 households. The following census in 2011 counted 103,786 people in 31,752 households. At the 2016 census, the county's population was 101,666 in 33,537 households.

Administrative divisions

The population history of Tuyserkan County's administrative divisions over three consecutive censuses is shown in the following table. The latest census shows two districts, seven rural districts, and three cities.

References

 

Counties of Hamadan Province